Kukherd District , also transliterated as Kookherd District, is a district (bakhsh) in Bastak County, Hormozgan Province, Iran.  At the 2016 census, its population was 13,201, in 2,675 families.  The District has one city (Kukherd) and two rural districts (dehestān): Harang Rural District and Kukherd Rural District.

Dams in Kukherd District
 Bust-e gez Dam 
 Buz Dam 
 Jaber Dam 
 Jawid Dam 
 Shamo Dam

See also 
 Zeer Mountain
 Dasak Mountain
 Khe Aab Mountain
 Nakh Mountain
 Castle of Siba
 Castle of Tawseelah
 Paraw Kukherd
 The Historic Bath of Siba
 Sassanid family tree — of the Sasanian (Sassanid) dynasty

References 

Peter Jackson and Lawrence Lockhart (Ed) (1986), Vol. 6th,  The Cambridge History of Iran: Cambridge University Press
الكوخردى ، محمد ، بن يوسف، (كُوخِرد حَاضِرَة اِسلامِيةَ عَلي ضِفافِ نَهر مِهران) الطبعة الثالثة ،دبى: سنة 199۷ للميلاد Mohammed Kookherdi (1997) Kookherd, an Islamic civil at Mehran river,  third edition: Dubai
محمدیان، کوخری، محمد ، “ (به یاد کوخرد) “، ج1. ج2. چاپ اول، دبی: سال انتشار 2003 میلادی Mohammed Kookherdi Mohammadyan (2003), Beyade Kookherd, third edition : Dubai.
محمدیان، کوخردی ، محمد ،  «شهرستان بستک و بخش کوخرد»  ، ج۱. چاپ اول، دبی: سال انتشار ۲۰۰۵ میلادی Mohammed Kookherdi Mohammadyan (2005), Shahrestan  Bastak & Bakhshe Kookherd, First edition : Dubai.
عباسی ، قلی، مصطفی،  «بستک وجهانگیریه»، چاپ اول، تهران : ناشر: شرکت انتشارات جهان
سلامى، بستكى، احمد.  (بستک در گذرگاه تاریخ)  ج2 چاپ اول، 1372 خورشيدى
اطلس گیتاشناسی استان‌های ایران [Atlas Gitashenasi Ostanhai Iran] (Gitashenasi Province Atlas of Iran)

External links 
 Kookherd website

Districts of Hormozgan Province
Bastak County